Panipenem (INN) is a carbapenem antibiotic used in combination with betamipron. It is not used in the United States.

See also 
 Panipenem/betamipron

References 

Carbapenem antibiotics
Pyrrolidines
Daiichi Sankyo